Roc is an American comedy-drama television series that aired on Fox from August 25, 1991 to May 10, 1994. The series stars Charles S. Dutton as Baltimore garbage collector Roc Emerson and Ella Joyce as his wife Eleanor, a nurse.

Overview

Early episodes
Roc began life as a traditional television sitcom, chronicling the ups and downs of Baltimore garbage collector Charles "Roc" Emerson (Charles S. Dutton), a tightwad who constantly brought home "perks" (i.e. items thrown away by residents on his route); his wife Eleanor (Ella Joyce), a registered nurse; his womanizing younger brother Joey (Rocky Carroll), a ne'er-do-well musician who had recently returned to the neighborhood; and his father Andrew (Carl Gordon), a retired Pullman porter. A much-played scene during the series' promotion featured Roc greeting his returning brother with a casual glance and a tired "Hey, Joey." When Eleanor suggests that he should have more to say, Roc agrees, and follows up with "Hey, Joey, where's my money?"

Live performances
The four principal cast members were all accomplished stage actors, and had become acquainted with each other while appearing in various August Wilson plays on Broadway. Three of the four leads were fresh from appearing in The Piano Lesson. In fact, Charles S. Dutton wanted all four of The Piano Lesson leads to be on the show (The fourth being S. Epatha Merkerson, who would go on to star in Law & Order for 17 years). After a successful live episode (guest-starring Dutton's then-wife Debbi Morgan) was broadcast in February 1992, the producers and the Fox network agreed to air each episode of the second season as a live performance. Virtually every episode from season two began with a prologue in which one of the cast members directly addressed the home viewers for a few minutes. A current events item from the past week, or even that very day, would be mentioned to prove that (East Coast) viewers were indeed watching a live performance, and current events from the previous week were frequently incorporated into the dialogue. One episode dealt with the 1992 Presidential Election, and aired the Sunday before the election. As the Emersons await the results, the director interrupts the program to mention that the results are unknown, causing "dismay" amongst the characters. Roc was the first prime time scripted American series since the late 1950s to broadcast each episode of an entire season live, a feat which wasn't repeated until the entire third season of NBC's Undateable was broadcast live in 2015. A Fox executive reportedly said that Roc "didn't feel live" to audiences because "those actors were so good, they never made a mistake." After the live format received only a limited ratings boost, the show returned to its original pre-taped format for season 3.

Social commentaries
As it progressed, the series adopted a more dramatic tone, with several installments featuring social commentaries on gang activities, violence among youths, the consequences of drug use on childbirth, and the plight of African-Americans in the United States.

One of the central problems around town was the arrival of a powerful drug dealer named Andre, whose efforts throughout the community were met with counter-movements from Roc and others. This began with a brief showdown at Roc's home in which an angered Roc eventually grabbed hold of Andre and warned him that his actions would not go unchallenged. This soon gave rise to several new characters, including a vigilante named Ronnie (played by rapper Tone Lōc) and Calvin, a co-worker and friend of Roc (played by rapper Heavy D). As the story line progressed, victories were back-and-forth between the two sides, with Andre taking one of Joey's young friends under his influence, taunting Roc, and eventually being shot on-screen by an unseen assailant. Roc became a quick police suspect but was exonerated, with the shooter soon revealed to be Calvin. As Calvin began his prison sentence, Roc and Eleanor agreed to raise his teenage daughter Sheila (Alexis Fields). Once recovered, Andre was eventually confronted by Joey, Ronnie, and several of their friends about his continuing to trouble the community. After later expressing a measure of respect toward Roc, Andre would soon begin steps toward reformation.

The series moved on, continuing to mix humor and occasional drama.

Cast

Main cast
Charles S. Dutton – Charles "Roc" Emerson, a garbage collector
Ella Joyce – Eleanor Carter Emerson, a night-shift nurse at Harbor Hospital (Wing C)
Rocky Carroll – Andrew Joseph "Joey" Emerson Jr., Roc's freeloading, trumpet playing brother
Carl Gordon – Andrew Joseph "Pop" Emerson Sr., Roc's widowed father, a retired railroad porter

Recurring cast
Garrett Morris – Wiz (Season 1)
Clifton Powell – Andre Thompson
Heavy D – Calvin Hendricks (Seasons 2–3)
Tone Lōc – Ronnie Paxton (Seasons 2–3; 7 episodes)
Jamie Foxx – Crazy George (Seasons 2–3; 9 episodes)
Barry Shabaka Henley – Ernie (Seasons 2–3; 7 episodes)
Darryl Sivad – Sly (Seasons 2–3; 6 episodes)
Loretta Devine – Cynthia (Season 2; 5 episodes)
Joan Pringle – Matty (Season 2; 4 episodes)
En Vogue – "The Downtown Divas" (Season 2)
Alexis Fields – Sheila Hendricks (Season 3)
Rosalind Cash – Margaret Carter, Eleanor's social-climber mother (Seasons 1–3; 3 episodes)
Richard Roundtree – Russell Emerson, Andrew's homosexual brother (Seasons 1–3; 4 episodes)

Guests
Kim Fields - Ruth (Season 2), Eleanor's younger sister

Episodes

Music 
The series' theme song began as "God Bless the Child," a composition written by iconic jazz vocalist Billie Holiday in 1939, who was born in Baltimore, Maryland where the show is set. It is performed by a cappella singer Jerry Lawson (lead singer of The Persuasions) and three unknown studio singers. It was eventually replaced with "Live Your Life Today", performed by En Vogue.

The original theme song was written by Fred Thaler, entitled "Keep On Walkin On". It was instead used in the closing credits at the end of each episode.

Release
The complete series was made available to viewers in July 2021 by Amazon Prime Video, BET+ and on video on demand via Pluto TV.

Reception 
While fans were devoted, their numbers were also low; for three seasons, Roc was acclaimed critically but was generally towards the bottom of the Nielsen ratings (though it did quite well in African American households). Roc gained recognition in the form of award nominations, including an Emmy nomination for its camera work, with Charles Dutton receiving an NAACP Image Award for Outstanding Actor in a Comedy Series.

Nielsen ratings
Season 1: #72 – 8.95 rating
Season 2: #71 – 8.91 rating 
Season 3: #102 – 5.10 rating

References

External links

1991 American television series debuts
1994 American television series endings
1990s American comedy-drama television series
1990s American black sitcoms
1990s American sitcoms
English-language television shows
Fox Broadcasting Company original programming
American live television series
Television series by Warner Bros. Television Studios
Television shows set in Baltimore
Television series by HBO Independent Productions
Mass media portrayals of the working class